Mount Sheridan el.  is a prominent mountain peak overlooking Heart Lake in the Red Mountains of Yellowstone National Park.  The peak is named in honor of General Philip H. Sheridan, U.S. Army, one of the early protectors of the park.

History

Members of the Washburn–Langford–Doane Expedition in 1870 gave this mountain the name of Brown Mountain, while Lt. Gustavus C. Doane, also a member of the expedition named the mountain Yellow Mountain.  In 1871 during the Hayden Geological Survey of 1871 Ferdinand Vandeveer Hayden named the peak Red Mountain.  Also in 1871, Captain John W. Barlow, a military member of the Hayden expedition ascended the peak on August 10, 1871 and named it Mount Sheridan to honor the general.  Years later the name Red Mountain was given to the entire range in which Mount Sheridan sits.

Mount Sheridan Trail

The summit can be reached via the Mount Sheridan Trail  which spurs off the Heart Lake Trail at the northwest corner of Heart Lake.

See also
 List of mountains and mountain ranges of Yellowstone National Park

Notes

Mountains of Yellowstone National Park
Mountains of Wyoming
Mountains of Teton County, Wyoming